Ananeon is a monotypic genus of  jumping spiders containing the single species, Ananeon howardensis. It was first described by B. J. Richardson in 2013, and is only found in the Northern Territory.

References

Monotypic Salticidae genera
Salticidae
Spiders of Australia